Peep is the debut album by Finnish alternative rock band The Rasmus (named just "Rasmus" back then), released on 23 September 1996 on Warner Music Finland.

They met their first manager and record producer, Teja Kotilainen in 1995 and signed with Warner Music Finland in February 1996. They released their first EP, called 1st, on Teja G. Records, in December 1995, which featured the songs "Frog", "Myself", "Funky Jam" and "Rakkauslaulu". The album was first released in Finland, where it went Gold, and later in Estonia and Russia, and subsequently worldwide.

Track listing
All songs are written by The Rasmus, unless where stated otherwise.

 "Ghostbusters" (Ray Parker Jr. cover) – 3:35
 "Postman" – 2:38
 "Fool" – 3:43
 "Shame" – 3:30
 "P.S." – 3:04
 "Julen är här igen" – 3:30
 "Peep" (instrumental) – 0:49
 "Frog" – 2:31
 "Funky Jam" – 2:13
 "Outflow" – 2:51
 "Myself" – 3:50
 "Life 705" – 5:09
 "Small" – 6:26
Untitled - (After 1 minute and 55 seconds of silence after the song "Small", you will hear a man saying something in Finnish and a child saying "hello" and "bye bye".)  (Hidden track)

Singles
The singles from Peep were not named after the songs. The names were "1st", "2nd" and "3rd". 1st is actually an EP, containing four tracks (including the non-album song "Rakkauslaulu"). Their very first music video was made for "Funky Jam" the same year.

 The first single from the album was 1st, released in 1995.
 2nd was the second single, released in 1996.
 3rd was the last single from the album, released in 1996.

Credits
The Rasmus
 Lauri Ylönen – vocals
 Pauli Rantasalmi – guitar
 Eero Heinonen – bass
 Janne Heiskanen – drums

Additional musicians
 Timo Lavanko – saxophone on "Outflow"
 Aleksi Ahoniemi – saxophone on "Postman" and "P.S."
 Jukka Tiirikainen – trumpet on "P.S."

Additional personnel
 The Rasmus and Teja Kotilainen – producers
 Juha Heininen, Ilkka Herkman, Teja Kotilainen – recorders
 Juha Heininen, Jarno Patala – mixers
 Pauli Saastamoinen – mastering
 Dick Lindberg, Klikki – photography

The Rasmus albums
1996 debut albums